Redemption Ark is a 2002 science fiction novel by Welsh author Alastair Reynolds set in the Revelation Space universe. It continues the story of Nevil Clavain begun in the short stories "Great Wall of Mars" and "Glacial".

Plot
The novel takes place around the planets Yellowstone and Resurgam, in two story lines which converge near the climax of the novel.

Yellowstone
The novel begins in the year 2605, where Skade has been tasked with investigating a Conjoiner ship that has returned to the Conjoiner headquarters, the Mother Nest. It is revealed early on that Skade is a Conjoiner woman who appears to be in touch with secret circles of control within the theoretically egalitarian Conjoiners society. In the ship, she discovers Galiana, the original founder of the Conjoiners, who left Conjoiner space decades previously on an exploration mission. In space, she encountered the Inhibitors, who have unleashed an agent into her ships which has taken control of it and killed her crew. It now controls her mind as well. Galiana requests that Skade kill her, but Skade only places her in suspended animation in the hope that she can be helped in the future.

Ten years later, Nevil Clavain is facing problems in the Conjoiner mother nest; he is struggling to find answers as to what happened to Galiana (he is unaware that she is still alive) and about Felka, who he believes may be his daughter. He ponders this as he leaves on a mission, during which he rescues Antoinette Bax as she buries her father in the gas giant Tangerine Dream. Her ship severely damaged, Antoinette limps back to the Rust Belt, a ring of orbital habitats around Yellowstone.

When Clavain and Skade return to the Mother Nest, Skade, Remontoire, and Felka finally convince Clavain to join the Conjoiner's leadership, which Clavain had been resisting. Skade now informs him about the Inhibitors, convincing him to undertake a mission to reclaim lost Conjoiner doomsday weapons and taking him to see the fleet of advanced starships that the Conjoiners have been building in secret. Although Skade claims that the weapons and ships will be used to defend humanity against the Inhibitors, Clavain is convinced that they will actually be used simply to evacuate the Conjoiners and abandon the rest of humanity. Clavain defects to the Demarchists at Yellowstone and spreads the news of the Inhibitors, enlisting Antoinette Bax's help to escape the pursuing Conjoiners under Skade.

Clavain is followed by Scorpio and Remontoire, but they along with Antoinette and Clavain are captured by the mysterious underground figure known as "H". H reveals what happened to Skade during a Conjoiner raid into Chasm City. This was when Skade discovered the secrets that would lead her to develop inertia suppression technology, and when H believes she was subverted by an alien intellect. Clavain reveals Skade's plans for the Conjoiner fleet and the cache weapons, and H agrees to help him beat Skade to them. H supplies ships and his own version of the inertial suppression technology, while Scorpio supplies an army of hyper-pigs for the pursuit.

Skade and Clavain race to the Resurgam system employing various creative long-distance strategies against each other and pushing their vessels to higher and higher speeds. Eventually, Skade's vessel is damaged in an attempt to exceed the speed of light. Clavain and crew arrive in the Zodiacal Light ready to recover the cache weapons.

Resurgam

Several years on (roughly 50 from the start of the book), Triumvir Ilia Volyova and Ana Khouri are on the planet Resurgam and have discovered a new threat; the Inhibitors, alerted to the presence of humanity during events described in Revelation Space, have begun dismantling several rocky moons across the system and are moving their components towards the gas giant, Roc. They resolve to evacuate Resurgam by enlisting the aid of the rebel Thorn who has been attempting to evacuate Resurgam all along, by opening communications with Captain John Brannigan who is in direct control of their ship due to the nanotechnological Melding Plague, and by enabling the Cache Weapons as a last resort against the Inhibitors. (These are the same weapons that Clavain will be sent to recover, and it was their activation during the events in the novel Revelation Space by Volyova which allowed the Conjoiners in Yellowstone to determine the weapons' location.)

Successful in all three endeavors, Volyova, Khouri, and Thorn begin the lengthy evacuation, while the Inhibitors continue their mysterious construction project. Only a few thousand people have been evacuated from the surface when the Inhibitors come so close to Resurgam's star that Volyova begins deploying the cache weapons in the hope that they will be able to buy more time. It is at this point that a beta-level simulation of Clavain arrives in a laser transmission, and attempts to negotiate the peaceful turn over of the cache weapons to the soon to be arriving Zodiacal Light. Volyova rejects his requests, explaining that she has greater need to the weapons and continues deploying them.

When Zodiacal Light arrives in the system, and because of the failure of the beta-level to negotiate a handover, Clavain attacks Nostalgia for Infinity using Scorpio and his army of pigs as a boarding party. Clavain's superior force capture Nostalgia for Infinity, although Volyova is able to damage Zodiacal Light with one of the cache weapons. Negotiations resume and the two sides come to terms. The evacuation is completed with the help of the Storm Bird and Nostalgia for Infinity departs; Volyova, who is dying from injuries suffered during a suicide attempt by the Captain takes half of the cache weapons and attacks the Inhibitors in the Storm Bird, to no effect. Remontoire and Khouri remain in the system in the Zodiacal Light to try and contact Dan Sylveste in the Hades Matrix in hope that he will be able to supply information that can be used to fight the Inhibitors.

The novel ends with Nostalgia for Infinity establishing a colony on an unnamed Pattern Juggler planet (in the following novel Absolution Gap it is called Ararat), waiting for the Zodiacal Light to catch up with them so that they can continue the fight against the Inhibitors.

Inhibitor Asides

In addition to the two plot lines there are occasional asides explaining the history and motivation of the Inhibitors. These asides explain the galaxy was once filled with star-faring civilizations. Those civilizations were largely destroyed in the "Dawn War", a galaxy-wide conflict over the galaxy's scarce resources. One of these civilizations determines that a collision between our galaxy and another will occur in 3 billion years and create/become the Inhibitors in order to shepherd intelligent life through this cataclysm. They had determined that collision could be most easily dealt with if intelligent life was kept isolated to individual star systems, leaving the Inhibitors to perform any necessary manipulations of stars and planets to reduce the damage caused by the collision.

The asides also reveal that the Inhibitors were not as brutal in their past, but their performance has degraded over the millennia. They have been detecting civilizations at later stages, and required to commit wholesale extinction more often.

Clavain and Felka learn of this history during communication with the Inhibitors in Galiana's head. Clavain, however, is not convinced that the Inhibitors are right about the coming catastrophe and believes that their degrading performance may give humanity a chance for survival that other species have not had. As such, he rejects the Inhibitor requests to stand down.

The future collision of our galaxy with the Andromeda Galaxy is a scientifically predicted event. However, astronomers believe that it would not cause major damage to the capability of the galaxy to support life because galaxies are so diffuse that very few, if any, planets and stars would collide.

Characters
 Ana Khouri
 Antoinette Bax
 Captain John Brannigan
 Felka
 Galiana
 Nevil Clavain
 Remontoire
 Schuyler "Sky" Haussmann / "H"
 Scorpio
 Skade
 Thorn
 Triumvir Ilia Volyova

Awards and nominations
 Best Science Fiction Novel of the Year (2002)" by Chronicle

Release details
2002, United Kingdom, Gollancz , Pub date 27 June 2002, Hardback
2002, United Kingdom, Gollancz , Pub date 27 June 2003, Paperback
2003, United States, Ace Books , Pub date 3 June 2003, Hardback
2003, United Kingdom, Gollancz , Pub date 8 May 2003, Paperback
2004, United States, Ace , Pub date 25 May 2004, Paperback

See also
Revelation Space universe

References

External links
 Infinity Plus Review by Stuart Carter
 SF Site review by David Soyka

2002 British novels
Space opera novels
Revelation Space
British science fiction novels
Hard science fiction
2002 science fiction novels
Novels by Alastair Reynolds